Sierra Leone competed at the 2019 World Championships in Athletics in Doha, Qatar, from 27 September to 6 October 2019.

Results

Women
Track and road events

References

Nations at the 2019 World Athletics Championships
World Championships in Athletics
Sierra Leone at the World Championships in Athletics